Original Dubliners is an album by The Dubliners. The album charted at No.14 in the Irish Album Chart in its 2011 re-release. In December 2013 the album re-issued into the charts at No.39. 
The double disc features EMI albums Seven Drunken Nights (a.k.a. A Drop of the Hard Stuff), Seven Deadly Sins (a.k.a. At It Again), Whiskey On A Sunday (a compilation) and More of the Hard Stuff.

Track list

Disc 1 
 Seven Drunken Nights
 
 The Galway Races
 
 The Old Alarm Clock
 
 Colonel Fraser & O'Rourke's Reel
 
 The Rising of the Moon
 
 McCafferty
 
 I'm a Rover
 
 Weila Weila Waile
 
 The Travelling People
 
 Limerick Rake
 
 Zoological Gardens
 
 The Fairmoye Lasses and Sporting Paddy
 
 Black Velvet Band
 
 Poor Paddy on the Railway
 
 Seven Deadly Sins
 
 Net Hauling Song
 
 Nancy Whiskey
 
 Many Young Men of Twenty
 
 Instrumental Medley: Paddy's Gone to France / Skylark
 
 Molly Bawn
 
 The Dundee Weaer
 
 The Irish Navy
 
 Tibby Dunbar
 
 The Inniskillen Dragoons
 
 I Wish I Were Back in Liverpool
 
 Go to Sea No More

Disc 2
 
 Instrumental Medley: the Piper's Chair / Billy Hart's Jig / The Night ...
 
 Darby O'Leary
 
 All for Me Grog
 
 Cork Hornpipe
 
 Peggy Gordon
 
 Maid of the Sweet Brown Knowe
 
 Quare Bungle Rye
 
 Flop Eared Mule (Donkey Reel)
 
 Poor Old Dicey Riley
 
 Whiskey on a Sunday
 
 Gentleman Soldier
 
 Navvy Boots
 
 Maids, When You're Young, Never Wed an Old Man
 
 Rattling Roaring Willie
 
 Mrs McGarth
 
 Carolan Concerto
 
 The Partin' Glass
 
 Muirsheen Durkin
 
 A Nation Once Again
 
Whiskey in the Jar
 
 The Old Triangle
 
 A Pub With No Beer
 
 Kelly, the Boy from Killan
 
 Croppy Boy
 
 Sullivan John
 
 Come and Join the British Army
 
 (The Bonny) Shoals of Herring
 
 Mormon Breas
 
 Drink It up Men

 Maloney Wants a Drink

Chart performance

References

The Dubliners compilation albums
1993 compilation albums
EMI Records compilation albums